Parichi, Paryčy or Parytchy(is an Urban settlement in Gomel Region, southern Belarus.

Location and history 
Paryčy is situated on the Berezina river, some 29 km north-west of Svetlahorsk, 40 km au south-east of Babruysk and 114 km north-west of Gomel.

The village became part of the Russian Empire after the Second Partition of Poland in 1793.
The settlement was occupied by the Wehrmacht on 5 July 1941, and the important Jewish community, some 1700 people, was exterminated in the following years. The settlement was liberated on 26 June 1944, during the Bobruysk offensive.

Sources
settlement website 

Urban-type settlements in Belarus
Populated places in Gomel Region
Minsk Voivodeship
Bobruysky Uyezd
Svietlahorsk District